The Ghost Dance (Caddo: Nanissáanah, also called the Ghost Dance of 1890) was a ceremony incorporated into numerous Native American belief systems. According to the teachings of the Northern Paiute spiritual leader Wovoka (renamed Jack Wilson), proper practice of the dance would reunite the living with spirits of the dead, bring the spirits to fight on their behalf, end American westward expansion, and bring peace, prosperity, and unity to Native American peoples throughout the region. 

The basis for the Ghost Dance is the circle dance, a traditional Native American dance. The Ghost Dance was first practiced by the Nevada Northern Paiute in 1889. The practice swept throughout much of the Western United States, quickly reaching areas of California and Oklahoma. As the Ghost Dance spread from its original source, different tribes synthesized selective aspects of the ritual with their own beliefs.

The Ghost Dance was associated with Wovoka's prophecy of an end to colonial expansion while preaching goals of clean living, an honest life, and cross-cultural cooperation by Native Americans. Practice of the Ghost Dance movement was believed to have contributed to Lakota resistance to assimilation under the Dawes Act. The Lakota variation on the Ghost Dance tended towards millenarianism, an innovation that distinguished the Lakota interpretation from Jack Wilson's original teachings. The Caddo still practice the Ghost Dance today.

History

Paiute influence 

The Northern Paiutes living in Mason Valley, in what is now the U.S. state of Nevada, were known collectively as the Tövusidökadö at the time of European contact. The Northern Paiute community at this time was thriving upon a subsistence pattern of fishing, hunting wild game, and foraging for pine nuts and roots such as Cyperus esculentus.

The Tövusidökadö during this period lacked any permanent political organization or officials and tended to follow various spiritual leaders and community organizers. Community events centered on the observance of seasonal ceremonies such as harvests or hunting. In 1869, Hawthorne Wodziwob, a Paiute man, organized a series of community dances to announce a vision. He spoke of a journey to the land of the dead and of promises made to him by the souls of the recently deceased. They promised to return to their loved ones within a period of three to four years.

Wodziwob's peers accepted this vision, likely due to his reputable status as a healer. He urged the populace to dance the common circle dance as was customary during a time of celebration. He continued preaching this message for three years with the help of a local "weather doctor" named Tavibo, father of Wovoka.

Prior to Wodziwob's religious movement, a devastating typhoid fever epidemic struck in 1867. This and other European diseases killed approximately one-tenth of the total population, resulting in widespread psychological and emotional trauma. The disruption brought disorder to the economic system and society. Many families were prevented from continuing their nomadic lifestyle.

Round Dance influence 
A round dance is a circular community dance held usually around an individual who leads the ceremony. Round dances may be ceremonial or purely social. Usually the dancers are accompanied by a group of singers who may also play hand drums in unison. The dancers join hands to form a large circle. The dancers move with a side-shuffle step to reflect the long-short pattern of the drum beat, bending their knees to emphasize the pattern.

During his studies of the Pacific Northwest tribes the anthropologist Leslie Spier used the term "prophet dances" to describe ceremonial round dances where the participants seek trance, exhortations and prophecy. Spier studied peoples of the Columbia plateau (a region including Washington, Oregon, Idaho, and parts of western Montana). By the time of his studies the only dances he was allowed to witness were social dances or ones that had already incorporated Christian elements, making investigation of the round dance's origin complicated.

The Prophet 

Jack Wilson, the prophet otherwise known as Wovoka, was believed to have had a vision during a solar eclipse on January 1, 1889. It was reportedly not his first time experiencing a vision, but as a young adult, he claimed that he was then better equipped, spiritually, to handle this message. Jack had received training from an experienced holy man under his parents' guidance after they realized that he was having difficulty interpreting his previous visions. Jack was also training to be a "weather doctor", following in his father's footsteps. He was known throughout Mason Valley as a gifted and blessed young leader. Preaching a message of universal love, he often presided over circle dances, which symbolized the sun's heavenly path across the sky. 

Anthropologist James Mooney conducted an interview with Wilson prior to 1892. Mooney confirmed that his message matched that given to his fellow Indians. This study compared letters between tribes. According to Mooney, Wilson's letter said he stood before God in heaven and had seen many of his ancestors engaged in their favorite pastimes, and that God showed Wilson a beautiful land filled with wild game and instructed him to return home to tell his people that they must love each other and not fight. He also stated that Jesus was being reincarnated on Earth in 1892, that the people must work, not steal or lie, and that they must not engage in the old practices of war or the traditional self-mutilation practices connected with mourning the dead. He said that if his people abided by these rules, they would be united with their friends and family in the other world, and in God's presence, there would be no sickness, disease, or old age.

Mooney writes that Wilson was given the Ghost Dance and commanded to take it back to his people. He preached that if the five-day dance was performed in the proper intervals, the performers would secure their happiness and hasten the reunion of the living and deceased. Wilson said that the Creator gave him powers over the weather and that he would be the deputy in charge of affairs in the western United States, leaving current President Harrison as God's deputy in the East. Jack claims that he was then told to return home and preach God's message.

Jack Wilson claimed to have left the presence of God convinced that if every Indian in the West danced the new dance to "hasten the event", all evil in the world would be swept away, leaving a renewed Earth filled with food, love, and faith. Quickly accepted by his Paiute brethren, the new religion was termed, "Dance In A Circle". Because the first European contact with the practice came by way of the Lakota, their expression "Spirit Dance" was adopted as a descriptive title for all such practices. This was subsequently translated as "Ghost Dance".

Spread of the prophet's message 

Through Native Americans and some white settlers, Wilson's message spread across much of the western portion of the United States. Early in the religious movement, many tribes sent members to investigate the self-proclaimed prophet, while other communities sent delegates only to be cordial. Regardless of their initial motivations, many left as believers and returned to their homeland preaching his message. The Ghost Dance was also investigated by many Mormons from Utah, for whom the concepts of the Indian prophet were familiar and often accepted. While many followers of the Ghost Dance believed Wovoka to be a teacher of pacifism and peace, others did not.

An elaboration of the Ghost Dance concept was the development of ghost shirts, which were special clothing that warriors could wear. They were rumored to repel bullets through spiritual power. It is uncertain where this belief originated. Scholars believe that in 1890 Chief Kicking Bear introduced the concept to his people, the Lakota, while James Mooney argued that the most likely source is the Mormon temple garment (which Mormons believe protect the pious wearer from evil).

The Lakota interpretation drew from their traditional idea of a "renewed Earth" in which "all evil is washed away". This Lakota interpretation included the removal of all European Americans from their lands:

Political influence 

In February 1890, the United States government broke a Lakota treaty by adjusting the Great Sioux Reservation of South Dakota (an area that formerly encompassed the majority of the state) and breaking it up into five smaller reservations. The government was accommodating white homesteaders from the eastern United States; in addition, it intended to "break up tribal relationships" and "conform Indians to the white man's ways, peaceably if they will, or forcibly if they must". On the reduced reservations, the government allocated family units on  plots for individual households. The Lakota were expected to farm and raise livestock, and to send their children to boarding schools. With the goal of assimilation, the schools taught English and Christianity, as well as American cultural practices. Generally, they forbade inclusion of Indian traditional cultures and languages.

To help support the Lakota during the period of transition, the Bureau of Indian Affairs (BIA) was to supplement the Lakota with food and to hire white farmers as teachers for the people. The farming plan failed to take into account the difficulty that Lakota farmers would have in trying to cultivate crops in the semi-arid region of South Dakota. By the end of the 1890 growing season, a time of intense heat and low rainfall, it was clear that the land was unable to produce substantial agricultural yields. Unfortunately, this was also the time when the government's patience with supporting the so-called "lazy Indians" ran out. They cut rations for the Lakota in half. With the bison having been virtually eradicated a few years earlier, the Lakota were at risk of starvation.

The people turned to the Ghost Dance ritual, which frightened the supervising agents of the BIA. Those who had been residing in the area for a long time recognized that the ritual was often held shortly before battle was to occur. Kicking Bear was forced to leave Standing Rock, but when the dances continued unabated, Agent James McLaughlin asked for more troops. He claimed the Hunkpapa spiritual leader Sitting Bull was the real leader of the movement. A former agent, Valentine McGillycuddy, saw nothing extraordinary in the dances and ridiculed the panic that seemed to have overcome the agencies, saying:

Nonetheless, thousands of additional U.S. Army troops were deployed to the reservation. On December 15, 1890, Sitting Bull was arrested for failing to stop his people from practicing the Ghost Dance. During the incident, one of Sitting Bull's men, Catch the Bear, fired at Lieutenant "Bull Head", striking his right side. He instantly wheeled and shot Sitting Bull, hitting him in the left side, between the tenth and eleventh ribs; this exchange resulted in deaths on both sides, including that of Sitting Bull.

Wounded Knee 

Spotted Elk (Lakota: Unpan Glešká – also known as Big Foot) was a Miniconjou leader on the U.S. Army's list of 'trouble-making' Indians. On December 29, 1890, he was stopped while en route to convene with the remaining Lakota chiefs. U.S. Army officers forced him to relocate with his people to a small camp close to the Pine Ridge Agency. Here the soldiers could more closely watch the old chief. That evening, December 28, the small band of Lakota erected their tipis on the banks of Wounded Knee Creek. The following day, during an attempt by the officers to collect weapons from the band, one young, deaf Lakota warrior refused to relinquish his arms. A struggle followed in which somebody's weapon discharged into the air. One U.S. officer gave the command to open fire, and the Lakota responded by taking up previously confiscated weapons; the U.S. forces responded with carbine firearms and several rapid-fire light-artillery Hotchkiss guns mounted on the overlooking hill. When the fighting had concluded, 25 U.S. soldiers lay dead, many killed by friendly fire. Among the 153 dead Lakota, most were women and children. Following the massacre, Chief Kicking Bear officially surrendered his weapon to General Nelson A. Miles.

Aftermath 

Outrage in the eastern United States emerged as the public learned about the deaths. The U.S. government had insisted on numerous occasions that the Indian had already been successfully "pacified". Many Americans felt the U.S. Army actions were unduly harsh; some related the massacre at Wounded Knee Creek to the "ungentlemanly act of kicking a man when he is already down". Public uproar played a role in the reinstatement of the previous treaty's terms, including full rations and more monetary compensation for lands taken away. 

Twenty U.S. soldiers received Medals of Honor for their actions (some sources state the number as 18 or 23). American Indian and human rights activists have referred to these as "Medals of Dis-Honor" and called for the awards to be rescinded, but none of them have ever been revoked.

Following the Wounded Knee Massacre, open participation in the Ghost Dance movement declined gradually for fear of continued violence against practitioners. Like most Indian ceremonies, it became clandestine rather than dying out completely.

Rejection 
Despite the widespread acceptance of the Ghost Dance movement, Navajo leaders described the Ghost Dance as "worthless words" in 1890. Three years later, James Mooney arrived at the Navajo reservation in northern Arizona during his study of the Ghost Dance movement and found the Navajo never incorporated the ritual into their society.

Kehoe believed the movement did not gain traction with the tribe due to the Navajo's higher levels of social and economic satisfaction at the time. Another factor was cultural norms among the Navajo, which inculcated a fear of ghosts and spirits, based on religious beliefs.

Today 
The Wounded Knee massacre was not the end of the Ghost Dance religious movement. Instead, it went underground. Wovoka continued to spread its message, along with Kicking Bear, Short Bull and other spiritual leaders.

During the Wounded Knee incident of 1973, Lakota men and women, including Mary Brave Bird, did the ghost dance ceremony on the site where their ancestors had been killed. In her book Lakota Woman, Brave Bird wrote that ghost dances continue as private ceremonies.

See also 
 Boxer Rebellion (1899–1901), during which Boxers claimed that the spirits protected them from bullets.
 Caroline Weldon, an artist and activist helping Sitting Bull.
 Medicine man
 Millennarianism in colonial societies
 Nemattanew, a captain of the Powhatan, died in 1622, who believed himself invulnerable to bullets.
 Nongqawuse, a Xhosa prophetess who in the 1850s led the Xhosa cattle-killing movement.
 Papa Isio, a shaman who led forces in the Philippine Revolution

References

Further reading 
 Andersson, Rani-Henrik. The Lakota Ghost Dance of 1890. Lincoln, Neb.: University of Nebraska Press, 2009. .
 Brown, Dee. Bury My Heart at Wounded Knee: An Indian History of the American West. New York: Holt Paperbacks, 2001. .
 DuBois, Cora. The 1870 Ghost Dance. Lincoln, Neb.: University of Nebraska Press, 2007. .
 Gage, Justin. We Do Not Want the Gates Closed Between Us: Native Networks and the Spread of the Ghost Dance. Norman, OK: University of Oklahoma Press, 2020. .
 Kehoe, Alice Beck. The Ghost Dance: Ethnohistory and Revitalization. Long Grove, Ill.: Waveland Press, 2006. .
 Osterreich, Shelley Anne. The American Indian Ghost Dance, 1870 and 1890. New York: Greenwood Press, 1991. .
 Stannard, David E. American Holocaust: The Conquest of the New World. Oxford: Oxford University Press, 1993. .
 Warren, Louis S. God's Red Son: The Ghost Dance Religion and the Making of Modern America. New York: Basic Books, 2017. .

External links 
"Communicating the Ghost Dance" on NativeAmericanNetworks.com
Ghostdance.us
Wovoka (Jack Wilson) 
Speech by Kicking Bear
Short video about Wovoka and the Ghost Dance on YouTube.com
 Encyclopedia of Oklahoma History and Culture – Ghost Dance Religion

Articles containing video clips
Caddo
Circle dances
Eschatology
 
Lakota culture
Native American history of California
Native American history of Nevada
Native American music
Paiute
Religion in Oklahoma
Ritual dances